Archive Series a.k.a. The Korgis Archive is a compilation album by English pop band The Korgis. It was released by Rialto Records in 1997.
This is a CD re-issue of the 1983 UK album The Best of The Korgis with eight additional tracks.

Track listing
"Everybody's Got to Learn Sometime" (Warren) - 4:13
 From 1980 album Dumb Waiters
"If I Had You" (Davis, Rachmaninoff) - 3:54
 From 1979 album The Korgis
"All the Love in the World" (Davis, Warren) - 3:38
 Single edit. Original version on 1981 album Sticky George
"I Just Can't Help It" (Davis) - 3:44
 Single remix. Original version on 1979 album The Korgis
"If It's Alright With You Baby" (Warren) - 4:01
 From 1980 album Dumb Waiters
"That Was My Big Mistake" (Davis, Warren) - 4:01
 Single edit. Original version on 1981 album Sticky George
"Domestic Bliss" (Gordon, Harrison, Warren) - 3:15
 From 1981 album Sticky George
"O Maxine" (Warren) - 2:39
 From 1979 album The Korgis
"Don't Say That It's Over" (Warren) - 2:46
 From 1981 album Sticky George
"Drawn and Quartered" (Warren) - 3:17
 From 1980 album Dumb Waiters
"It's No Good Unless You Love Me" (Warren) - 3:22
 From 1980 album Dumb Waiters
"Rover's Return" (Davis) - 3:31
 From 1980 album Dumb Waiters
"Sticky George" (Harrison, Warren) - 3:36
 From 1981 album Sticky George
"Can't We Be Friends Now" (Warren) - 4:01
 From 1981 album Sticky George  
"Foolishness of Love" (Harrison) - 3:31
 From 1981 album Sticky George 
"Nowhere to Run" (Davis, Warren) - 4:15
 Original 1981 album version from Sticky George
"Dumb Waiters" (Warren) - 2:42
 From 1980 album Dumb Waiters
"Perfect Hostess" (Davis) - 3:21
 From 1980 album Dumb Waiters 
"Love Ain't Too Far Away" (Davis) - 3:29
 From 1980 album Dumb Waiters
"Living on the Rocks" (Warren) - 3:32
 From 1981 album Sticky George

Release history
 1997 Rialto Records RMCD 213 (CD)

References

The Korgis albums
1997 compilation albums